Claire Elizabeth Hardwick (born 3 November 1960) is an English actress.  She portrayed the role of Val Pollard in the ITV soap opera Emmerdale (2004–2015, 2017). In 2019, she began portraying the role of Sue Carp in the Channel 4 comedy-drama series Ackley Bridge.

Career
In addition to her role in Emmerdale, Hardwick starred in the 2000 comedy film Purely Belter, and had a role in Billy Elliot. She won the best actress award at the Monte Carlo International Television Festival in 1998 for her role in Amber Films' The Scar, about a County Durham pit community in crisis. She also starred as Sian, a youth worker in Byker Grove.

In 2003, Hardwick played Maggie Thomas in an episode of The Royal. In 2007, Hardwick was an occasional contributor on Grumpy Old Women. For her role on Emmerdale, Hardwick has been nominated seven times at the British Soap Awards, winning in 2006 for Best Comedy Performance.

Hardwick has acted in a number of stage productions, including starring in Cooking with Elvis alongside Frank Skinner, which toured nationally. In 2012, she starred in the comedy play The Awkward Squad.

In 2019, Hardwick joined the third series of the Channel 4 comedy drama Ackley Bridge as Sue Carp.

Awards and nominations

References

External links

1960 births
Living people
English film actresses
English television actresses
English soap opera actresses
Actresses from Newcastle upon Tyne